Norbert Wissing (May 18, 1959, Amsterdam - March 3, 2019) was a Dutch composer of chamber music, orchestral music, music for theatre and classical music. He got his training from Lex van Delden.

Musical style
His legacy consists of a series Musica: solo pieces some with accompaniment, some solo; and of a series Canto: large scale works for chamber ensembles and orchestras.

The style of Wissing's music can be described as moderately modern or Neo-Romantic. He had been using long melodic lines in a basically modal world, his harmonies are built on fourths. The orchestration of Wissing's music is refined and powerful. Influences on his melodic style have been traced back to Carl Nielsen and Leoš Janáček, while the orchestration of Wissing is influenced by Gustav Mahler, Dmitri Shostakovitch and Richard Strauss. 

He died on March 3, 2019, of a heart-attack

Orchestral works
Fassbinders Tod 1997
Symphony No1 2003
Symphony no2 2007
symphony no3 2008/9
Impressione di una mallatia 2009/11
La vita con un autistico 2010/12
Ansia per Orchestra 2015/16
Symfonie No 4 2016/17

Chamber music
Brass Quintet No1 1987
Brass Quintet No2 2006/9
String Quartet 1998
Libramente per ensemble da camara 2012
Musica per Oboe d'amore e Arpa 2013
String Quartet no2 2016
Piano trio 2016/18
Sonate voor bastrombone en piano 2017
Tweede Strijkkwartet 2018

Music theatre
Die Todes Fuge for voice and orchestra, 2002/10

References

1959 births
2019 deaths
21st-century classical composers
Dutch male classical composers
Dutch classical composers
Dutch classical musicians
Musicians from Amsterdam
21st-century male musicians